Ratibor is an unincorporated community in eastern Bell County, Texas, with a population of about 10 according to the Handbook of Texas in 2000. It is located within the Killeen-Temple-Fort Hood metropolitan area.

History
The town, formed about 1900, is named for Ratiboř in the Zlín Region of Moravia, Czech Republic. In 1855, Ratiboř was part of the Austrian Empire. The community had 10 residents and four businesses in 1933, which grew to 80 in 1940, dropped to 20 in 1964, and then stopped at 10 from 1990 through 2000.

Ratibor is known for Ratibor Country Grill, the only remaining open business in town, that serves as a restaurant and formerly a store for residents.

Geography

Education
In 1903, Ratibor had a school named Lost Prairie School that had 39 students and one teacher. Today, the community is served by the Rogers Independent School District.

References

Czech communities in the United States
Unincorporated communities in Texas
Unincorporated communities in Bell County, Texas